Bogdan Mitache (born 1 January 1994) is a Romanian professional footballer who plays as a defender.

Honours

Club
Viitorul Constanța
Liga I: 2016–17

References

External links
 
 

1994 births
Living people
People from Medgidia
Romanian footballers
Association football defenders
Liga I players
Liga II players
FC Viitorul Constanța players
FC Delta Dobrogea Tulcea players
FC Voluntari players